Karen Stratton (born ) is an American politician, cannabis farmer, and businessperson in the cannabis industry. She is a Spokane City Councilperson. She graduated from Marycliff High School in Spokane, and earned a bachelor's degree from Eastern Washington University.

Stratton was appointed to the Spokane City Council in 2014, then won election in 2015. She won an election to keep her seat on the City Council in 2019.

References

External links
Karen Stratton official website, Spokane City Council

1958 births
Living people
Politicians from Spokane, Washington
Eastern Washington University alumni
Washington (state) city council members
American women farmers
Farmers from Washington (state)
21st-century American businesswomen
21st-century American businesspeople
21st-century American women politicians
Businesspeople in the cannabis industry
American cannabis activists
Activists from Washington (state)
Women city councillors in Washington (state)
21st-century American politicians